Gösta Hammarlund (30 January 1903 – 12 July 1987) was a Norwegian illustrator and journalist.

Biography
Gustav Harald Hammarlund was born in Stockholm, Sweden. He was the son of ship owner Thomas Fredrik Olsen (1857-1933). 
He grew up in Stockholm with the Hammarlund family. He came to Norway as a 13 year old and started at Halling Skole at Kristiania (now Oslo).  In 1922, he graduated from Oslo Commerce School (Oslo Handelsgymnasium). He worked as an office manager  in the shipping business of his father until 1937. He started working for the newspaper Dagbladet with his own daily comic strip in 1940. From the early 1950s,  he had a daily column on Dagbladet'''s third page.   In the post-World War II  period, he initiated a working relationship with sports editor Jørgen Juve (1906–1983) which resulted in drawings and portraits for weekly Saturday interviews in Dagbladet. 

Among his books are the novel Møte med fru Brontze from 1939 and Berømte elskovspar from 1951. He illustrated several books by other writers. He was awarded the Narvesen Prize (Narvesenprisen) in 1956 and the  Oslo Cultural Prize (Oslo kommunes kulturpris'') in 1977.

References

1903 births
1987 deaths
Journalists from Stockholm
Norwegian illustrators
Norwegian columnists
20th-century Norwegian writers
Burials at Vestre gravlund
20th-century Norwegian journalists